Derendorf is a quarter of Düsseldorf, Germany, part of the central Borough 1.  It is located north of Pempelfort and Golzheim, west of Mörsenbroich and south of Unterrath.

Derendorf was mentioned as a settlement first time in 1100. In 1384 Derendorf became a part of Düsseldorf.
There has been a slaughterhouse in Derendorf since 1602. The main growth of Derendorf was in the time of Industrial Revolution.

Derendorf is traditionally an industrial area of Düsseldorf, inhabited mostly by a working-class population. The steelworks of Rheinmetall, the slaughterhouse and the brewery Schlösser are located here .

Many inhabitants of Derendorf are immigrants from Turkey, and the borough houses the central mosque of the Muslims in Düsseldorf.

See also 
 Düsseldorf-Derendorf station

References

External links

 Administration, District Administration 

Derendorf